Richard Henry Beck (born January 21, 1940) is a former Major League Baseball pitcher. Beck played for the New York Yankees in the  baseball season.

References

External links

1940 births
Living people
New York Yankees players
Major League Baseball pitchers
Baseball players from Washington (state)
Gonzaga Bulldogs baseball players
People from Pasco, Washington
Columbia Basin Hawks baseball players
Bakersfield Bears players
Chattanooga Lookouts players
Columbus Confederate Yankees players
Idaho Falls Yankees players
Syracuse Chiefs players
Tidewater Tides players